Doddington Hall may refer to:

Doddington Hall, Lincolnshire
Doddington Hall, Cheshire
Doddington Hall, Victorian residence replacing the Rectory in Doddington, Cambridgeshire

See also
 Dodington Hall in Somerset

Architectural disambiguation pages